The Liberal Party was a political party in Trinidad and Tobago. It contested the 1966 general elections, receiving 8.9% of the vote, but failed to win a seat. It did not contest any further elections.

References

Defunct political parties in Trinidad and Tobago
Defunct liberal political parties
Liberal parties in North America